Sage is a family name and a unisex given name. It can also be spelled Saige, Sange or Sayge. Its meaning is "herb” or “prophet”.

Surname
Amanda Sage (born 1978), American born painter based in Vienna
Andrew P. Sage (1933–2014), American systems engineer
 Anna Sage, alias of Ana Cumpănaș (1889–1947), brothel owner in Chicago
Angie Sage (born 1952), English author
Balthazar-Georges Sage (1740–1824), French chemist
Bill Sage (born 1962), American actor
Chauncey S. Sage (1816–1890), New York assemblyman
George Sage (disambiguation), several people
Greg Sage (born 1951), American punk musician
Harry Sage (1864–1947), American Major League Baseball catcher
Henry Sage (disambiguation), several people
Joe Sage (1920–1977), American politician
Kay Sage (1898–1963), American Surrealist artist and poet
Leland Sage (1899–1989), American history professor
Lorna Sage (1943–2001), English academic, literary critic
Margaret Olivia Slocum Sage (1828–1918), American philanthropist
Mel Sage (b. 1964), English former footballer
Paula Sage (born ), Scottish actress, Special Olympian, advocate
Rachael Sage (born 1971), American songwriter
Rosemary Sage, English expert in special needs education
Russell Sage (1816–1906), American financier and politician
Sidney A. Sage (1852–1909), American politician
Thomas Henry Sage (1882–1945), English recipient of the Victoria Cross
William H. Sage (1859–1922), American Medal of Honor recipient

First name
Sage Beckett (born 1985), American professional wrestler
Sage Brocklebank (born 1978), Canadian actor
Sage Canaday (born 1985), American long-distance runner
Sage Dixon, American politician 
Sage Elsesser (born 1997), American rapper
Sage Erickson (born 1990), American surfer
Sage Fox, American veteran and civil rights leader
Sage Francis (born 1976), American rapper
Sage Karam (born 1995), American racing driver
Sage Kinvig (born 1870–1962), one of the last native speaker of the Manx language
Sage Kirkpatrick (born 1969), Czech actress
Sage Kotsenburg (born 1993), American snowboarder
Saige Martin, American artist and politician
Sage Northcutt (born 1996), American mixed martial artist
Sage Rosenfels (born 1978), American football quarterback
Sage Sharp (born 1985), American software engineer
Sage Stallone (1976–2012), American actor
Sage Steele (born 1972), American television host
Sage Sohier (born 1954), American photographer
Sage Surratt (born 1998), American football player
Sage Walker, American science fiction writer
Sage Watson (born 1994), Canadian athlete
Sage Weil (born 1978), American architect

See also
Lesage (disambiguation)
Jenny Sages (born 1933), Australian artist
William Sage Rapson (1912–1999), New Zealand-South African chemist

English-language surnames
Given names
Given names derived from plants or flowers
Occupational surnames